Monterey is an unincorporated community in northern Reynolds County, in the U.S. state of Missouri.

The community is on Missouri Route MM just east of Johnson's Shut-Ins State Park. Shut-in Creek flows past the community.

History
A post office called Monterey was established in 1894, and remained in operation until 1957. The community most likely takes its name from Monterey, California, perhaps via the Battle of Monterey.

References

Unincorporated communities in Reynolds County, Missouri
Unincorporated communities in Missouri